Engozero was a military air base of the Soviet Air Force in Karelia, Russia. Engozero was closed and the majority of the air base no longer exists.

References

RussianAirFields.com

Soviet Air Force bases